Bhanuvalli  is a village in the southern state of Karnataka, India. It is located in the Harihar taluk of Davanagere district.

Demographics
 India census, Bhanuvalli had a population of 8,706 with 4,480 males and 4,226 females.

See also
 Davanagere
 Districts of Karnataka

References

External links
 http://Davanagere.nic.in/

Villages in Davanagere district